Anna Neshcheret (born 2 November 1981) is a Ukrainian former competitive figure skater. She finished 12th at the 1997 World Junior Championships in Seoul, South Korea, and 5th at the 1999 Winter Universiade in Žilina, Slovakia.

Competitive highlights 
JGP: Junior Series / Junior Grand Prix

References 

1981 births
Ukrainian female single skaters
Living people
Sportspeople from Kyiv
Competitors at the 1999 Winter Universiade